Newstalgia is a 2013 studio album by American hip hop artist Time. It was released on October 29, 2013, and features contributions from Budo, Jake One, Factor, Xiu Xiu, and Ceschi, among others.

Track listing

References

External links
 
 

2013 albums
Time (rapper) albums
Albums produced by Factor (producer)
Albums produced by Jake One